Indigo Lake may refer to:

Indigo Lake, Alaska
Indigo Lake, Ohio